The 1994 Korean League Cup, also known as the Adidas Cup 1994, was the fourth competition of the Korean League Cup.

Table

Matches

Awards

Source:

See also
1994 K League

References

External links
Official website
RSSSF

1994
1994
1994 domestic association football cups
1994 in South Korean football